City Point Bus Terminal is a bus station in South Boston, Massachusetts. It serves MBTA bus routes 7, 9, 10 and 11. From 2004 to 2009, it was the terminus of Silver Line route SL3.

History

The City Point area is served by the route 7, 9, 10 and 11 buses, all of which terminate at City Point Bus Terminal on East 1st Street between M and N streets. All were formerly streetcar routes.  Service was converted to bus on the 7, 9, and 10 in 1953; they were some of the last Boston-area streetcar lines to be bustituted, and the #9 was one of the last two lines (the other being the #43, which was bustituted in 1961) to serve the Pleasant Street incline.  Streetcars last ran on the #11 in 1929. Until October 1985, when the modern turnaround loop was built, service ran to the former carhouse location at East 2nd Street and O Street. 

SL3 (–City Point) Silver Line service began on December 17, 2004. City Point served as the terminal except for April 9 to August 20, 2005, when weekday daytime service was extended to Farragut Road. SL3 service ended on March 20, 2009.

Until 2017, the off-street loop at City Point was only used for layovers; passengers waited at ordinary sidewalk stops. In May 2017, the MBTA announced plans to convert the layover facility to a passenger terminal with a platform, shelters, and seating. The renovation was completed in September 2017.

References

South Boston
Silver Line (MBTA) stations
2004 establishments in Massachusetts
2008 disestablishments in Massachusetts